The 29th Utah Senate District is located in Washington County and includes Utah House Districts 71, 74, and 75. The current State Senator representing the 29th district is Don L. Ipson. Ipson was appointed to replace Steve Urquhart in the Utah State Senate in 2016.

Previous Utah State Senators (District 29)

Election results

2004 General Election

See also

 John W. Hickman
 Utah Democratic Party
 Utah Republican Party
 Utah Senate

External links
 Utah Senate District Profiles
 Official Biography of John W. Hickman

29
Washington County, Utah